Primitive Man, the second studio album by Australian rock band Icehouse, was released on September 20th, 1982. In January 1982, Icehouse founder Iva Davies started recording Primitive Man essentially as a solo project. It was co-produced with Keith Forsey, who later worked with Simple Minds and Billy Idol. Forsey supplied additional percussion; Davies supplied vocals, lead guitar, keyboards (Sequential Circuits Prophet-5), bass guitar and programmed the Linn drum machine. Released as an Icehouse album, Primitive Man reached number 3 on the National album charts and provided their international breakthrough single, "Hey Little Girl", which peaked at number 7 in Australia, number 2 in Switzerland, number 5 in Germany, the top 20 in UK, Sweden and Netherlands, and number 31 on the US Billboard Mainstream Rock chart. Another single "Great Southern Land" made the Australian top 5; it was later featured in the 1988 Yahoo Serious film Young Einstein, and remains their most popular song according to listeners of Triple M in 2007. To promote Primitive Man on tour, Davies re-assembled Icehouse with Michael Hoste (keyboards) and John Lloyd (drums), and new members: Bob Kretschmer (guitar, backing vocals), Guy Pratt (bass guitar, backing vocals) and Andy Qunta (keyboards, backing vocals).

After the United Kingdom top 20 chart success of "Hey Little Girl" the album was re-released as Love in Motion in 1983 and contained the same tracks in different order except "Break These Chains" being replaced by "Love in Motion"; the alternate cover work was a still from the Russell Mulcahy directed video for "Hey Little Girl" (see infobox below right). In 1996, Icehouse released a compilation album called Love in Motion on dIVA / Massive Records, which contains "Love in Motion" but does not have any material from the original Australian release of Primitive Man.

Primitive Man represented a slight departure from earlier material and a move from the more rock-based style of their first album to the synth-based, more atmospheric albums such as Sidewalk and Measure for Measure. This style is exemplified in "Hey Little Girl", a very relaxed, introspective song which reflects the overall tone of the album punctuated by the heavier "Glam" and the more dance-based "Mysterious Thing". The final track "Goodnight Mr. Matthews" was Iva Davies by his own account directly referencing John Lennon's songwriting and singing style for the first and only time.

The "Street Café" music video clip was filmed in Tunisia, in a four-day visit into which was packed a lifetime’s worth of difficult, unpleasant, and even hazardous living experiences for performers and film crew alike. Iva Davies flew out of Tunisia still covered with dust and camel dung, clad in the boots, breeches, and bandolier used in the filming, and vowing never to return to that part of the world again.

Track listing
All songs written by Iva Davies.

1982 Australian release

1983 US / UK release

Personnel
Credited to:

Icehouse members
Iva Davies – vocals, guitar, Sequential Circuits Prophet-5, bass guitar, Linn drum machine, Fairlight CMI
Michael Hoste – keyboards (bonus tracks)
Bob Kretschmer – guitar (bonus tracks)
John Lloyd – drums (bonus tracks)
Guy Pratt – bass guitar (bonus tracks)

Additional musicians
Keith Forsey – additional percussion
Abraham Laboriel – bass guitar (bonus tracks)
James SK Wān – bamboo flute

Recording details
Mixing – Cameron Allan, Bob Clearmountain, Iva Davies, Keith Forsey
Engineer – Dave Jerden, Brian Reeves, David Price, Rick Butz
Produced – Iva Davies, Keith Forsey
Digital remastering (2002) – Iva Davies, Ryan Scott

Art work
Front Cover – Bill Tom
Sleeve & Back Cover Photography – Craig Dietz
Cover Concept – Janet Levinson, Iva Davies
Cover design (Love in Motion) – David Storey

Charts

Weekly charts

Year-end charts

Certifications

References

1982 albums
Icehouse (band) albums
Albums produced by Keith Forsey
Chrysalis Records albums